Postmedia Network Canada Corp. (also known as Postmedia Network, Postmedia News or Postmedia) is a Canadian media conglomerate consisting of the publishing properties of the former Canwest, with primary operations in newspaper publishing, news gathering and Internet operations. It is best known for being the owner of the National Post and the Financial Post. The company is headquartered at Postmedia Place, located on Bloor Street of Toronto.

The company's strategy has seen its publications invest greater resources in digital news gathering and distribution, including expanded websites and digital news apps for smartphones and tablets. This began with a revamp and redesign of the Ottawa Citizen, which debuted in 2014.

Postmedia is currently 66% owned by American media conglomerate Chatham Asset Management.

History
The ownership group was assembled by National Post CEO Paul Godfrey in 2010 to bid for the chain of newspapers being sold by the financially troubled Asper family's Canwest (the company's broadcasting assets were sold separately to Shaw Communications). Godfrey secured financial backing from a U.S. private equity firm, the Manhattan-based hedge fund GoldenTree Asset Management—which owns 35 per cent—as well as IJNR Investment Trust, Nyppex and  other investors. The group completed a $1.1 billion transaction to acquire the chain from Canwest on July 13, 2010.

On October 6, 2014, Postmedia's CEO Godfrey announced a deal to acquire the English-language operations of Sun Media. The purchase received regulatory approval from the federal Competition Bureau on March 25, 2015, even though the company manages competitive papers in several Canadian cities; while the Sun Media chain owns numerous other papers, four of its five Sun-branded tabloids operate in markets where Postmedia already publishes a broadsheet competitor. Board chair Rod Phillips has cited the Vancouver market, in which the two main daily newspapers, the Vancouver Sun and The Province, have had common ownership for over 30 years, as evidence that the deal would not be anticompetitive. The purchase did not include Sun Media's now-defunct Sun News Network. The acquisition was approved by the Competition Bureau on March 25, 2015, and closed on April 13.

Margo Goodhand, a former Edmonton Journal editor-in-chief, wrote in a 2016 Walrus article that Postmedia executives were behind outsourcing of Postmedia content to produce “Regina Leader-Post sports pages, Arts fronts for the Montreal Gazette, editorial pages for the Vancouver Sun” to a site within an office in Canada.

In 2016, the company sought to restructure its compensation plans and reduce spending by as much as 20%, after reporting a net loss of $99.4 million, or 35 cents per diluted share, in the fourth-quarter ended Aug 31, compared with a $54.1 million net loss, or 19 cents per diluted share, in the same period a year earlier. This resulted in 90 newsroom staff losing their jobs.

On November 27, 2017, Postmedia and Torstar announced a transaction in which Postmedia will sell seven dailies, eight community papers, and the Toronto and Vancouver 24 Hours to Torstar, in exchange for 22 community papers and the Ottawa and Winnipeg versions of Metro. Except for the Exeter Times-Advocate, St. Catharines Standard, Niagara Falls Review, Peterborough Examiner, and Welland Tribune, all acquired papers will be closed.

In March 2018, the Competition Bureau issued a court filing accusing the two companies of structuring the deal with no-compete clauses in an effort to reduce competition in the newspaper industry, in violation of the Competition Act.

On June 26, 2018, Canadian Press reported that, by the end of August, Postmedia will be closing the Camrose Canadian in Camrose, Alberta, Strathmore Standard in Strathmore, Alberta, Kapuskasing Northern Times in Kapuskasing, Ontario, Ingersoll Times in Ingersoll, Ontario, Norwich Gazette in Norwich, Ontario  and Petrolia Topic in Petrolia, Ontario. It will also cease printing the Portage Daily Graphic in Portage La Prairie, Manitoba, the Northern News in Kirkland Lake, Ontario, and Pembroke Daily Observer in Pembroke, Ontario while maintaining a digital presence for the three publications. As well, the High River Times in High River, Alberta will go from being published twice a week to once a week.

On November 27, 2018, The Competition Bureau applied for a court evaluation contesting Postmedia's claims of solicitor-client privilege, for records seized by the bureau during raids at the company's offices.

In June 2019, Kevin Libin, the National Post and Financial Post comments editor and editorials editor and a founding editor of Western Standard,  was assigned “executive editor of Postmedia politics". The role focuses on coverage for federal politics in the Post. In addition, it focuses on coverage of  federal and provincial politics within  all of the dailies owned by Postmedia.

In November 2019, Postmedia announced that 66% of its shares were now owned by Chatham Asset Management, an American media conglomerate which owns American Media, Inc., and is known for its close ties to the Republican party.

In a 2020 article by The New York Times, it was reported that journalists had attested that since Chatham Asset Management had taken over, Postmedia had centralized operations and cut staff so that its 106 newspapers are basically clones of one another.

On February 17, 2022, Postmedia announced a definitive agreement to acquire  Brunswick News Inc. (BNI). As well as several New Brunswick daily and weekly newspapers and "digital properties", BNI's assets included a parcel delivery business and "proprietary distribution software".

In 2023, Postmedia announced it would be moving a dozen of its Alberta community papers to digital-only platforms, aiming for more outsourcing deals and laying off employees. The announcement was made January 18, 2023, during an internal memo to staff that was obtained by The Canadian Press, describing the measures as a part of a “transformation plan geared toward managing costs.” Later the same day, the newspaper publisher said it has also sold the Calgary Herald building for $17.23 million to U-Haul Co. after trying to sell it for nearly a decade.

Operating Branch 
Postmedia News is the "news" branch of Postmedia Network, providing similar content to all of its subsidiary news outlets and websites. It is identified as a source on all of its subsidiary newspapers. The news agency provides news, sports, entertainment, photography, financial and feature information and data to Postmedia Network's Canadian newspapers, online properties and a number of third party clients in Canada and the United States.

Pandemic Shutdown

During the pandemic, Postmedia laid off approximately 80 employees and permanently closed 15 community publications while navigating the financial strain of COVID-19. While the company utilized government subsidies, they claim they were unable to offset the decline in revenue.

Postmedia closed 15 community newspapers in Manitoba and Ontario’s Windsor-Essex area as the publications were no longer financially sustainable.The publications included Manitoba’s Altona Red River Valley Echo, Carman Valley Leader, Gimli Intertake Spectator, Morden Times, Selkirk Journal, Stonewall Argus & Teulon Times, Winkler Times, and The Prairie Farmer, leaving Portage La Prairie as the company’s community presence in the province.For Ontario, the closures included the Kingsville Reporter, Lakeshore News (Windsor-Essex area), LaSalle Post, Napanee Guide, Paris Star, Tecumseh Shoreline Week, and Tilbury Times.

Controversies 
The creation of the Postmedia Network effectively concentrates more than 90 percent of all Canadian dailies and weeklies in one company, a fact lamented by J-Source, a Canadian media watchdog, in a 2015 online article.

In 2016, Godfrey took a $900,000 bonus during a time that Postmedia laid off staff company-wide. Also during that time, CFO Doug Lamb received $450,000, COO Andrew MecLeod $425,000, legal and general counsel Jeffrey Harr $300,000, and then National Post president Gordon Fisher $200,000. Unions representing Canadian journalists wanted the Postmedia executives to reject the total $2.275 million as the newspaper chain continued to cut staff.

In October 2018, it was reported that CEO Andrew MacLeod had declared the company "insufficiently conservative." That resulted in Kevin Libin, who had played an active role in defeating a union drive at the paper earlier that year, taking charge of all political reporting and analysis in Postmedia newspapers to ensure the newspapers became more "reliably conservative."

Assets

Advertising
 The Flyer Force
 Go!Local

Publishing

Broadsheet dailies and weeklies
National Post
Financial Post (administratively part of the National Post)
Belleville Intelligencer
Brantford Expositor
Calgary Herald
Cornwall Standard Freeholder
Edmonton Journal
Kenora Daily Miner and News
Kingston Whig-Standard
London Free Press
Montreal Gazette
North Bay Nugget
Ottawa Citizen
Regina Leader-Post
The StarPhoenix (Saskatoon)
Sault Star 
Sudbury Star
Timmins Daily Press
The Vancouver Sun (not related to the tabloid Sun newspapers also owned by Postmedia)
Windsor Star

Tabloid dailies 
Calgary Sun
Edmonton Sun
Ottawa Sun
The Province (Vancouver)
Toronto Sun
Winnipeg Sun

Community newspapers 
Postmedia owns newspapers that serve smaller communities across Canada, including:
Airdrie Echo (tabloid)
Bow Valley Crag & Canyon (tabloid)
Brockville Recorder and Times (broadsheet)
Chatham This Week (tabloid)
Clinton News-Record (tabloid)
Cochrane Times (Alberta) (tabloid)
Cochrane Times-Post (tabloid)
Cold Lake Sun (tabloid)
Drayton Valley Western Review (tabloid)
Edson Leader (tabloid)
Elliot Lake Standard (tabloid)
Fort McMurray Today (tabloid)
Fort Saskatchewan Record (tabloid)
Goderich Signal-Star (tabloid)
Grande Prairie Daily Herald-Tribune (tabloid)
Hanna Herald (tabloid)
High River Times (tabloid)
Hinton Parklander (tabloid)
Kincardine News (tabloid)
Kingston This Week (tabloid)
Lakeshore Advance (Grand Bend; tabloid)
Lloydminster Meridian Booster (tabloid) sold to Lloydminster Source Ltd
Mid-North Monitor (Espanola; tabloid)
Mayerthorpe Freelancer (tabloid)
Nanton News (tabloid)
Owen Sound Sun Times (broadsheet)
Peace River Record-Gazette (broadsheet)
Pincher Creek Echo (tabloid)
Red River Valley Echo (tabloid) closed 2020
Sherwood Park News (tabloid)
Simcoe Reformer (tabloid)
St. Thomas Times-Journal (tabloid)
Stratford Beacon Herald (broadsheet)
Vulcan Advocate (tabloid)
Vermilion Standard (tabloid)
Whitecourt Star (tabloid)
Winkler Times (tabloid)
Woodstock Sentinel-Review (broadsheet)

Former assets
 24 Hours (Toronto, Vancouver) sold to Torstar and closed, 2017
Barrie Examiner (sold to Torstar and closed, 2017)
Bradford Times (tabloid) sold to Torstar and closed, 2017
Camrose Canadian (tabloid), closing 2018
Collingwood Enterprise Bulletin sold to Torstar and closed, 2017
Niagara Falls Review (broadsheet) sold to Torstar, 2017
Norwich Gazette, closing 2018
Orillia Packet & Times (broadsheet) sold to Torstar and closed, 2017
Pembroke Daily Observer (broadsheet), ceasing print edition 2018
Peterborough Examiner (broadsheet) sold to Torstar, 2017
St. Catharines Standard (broadsheet) sold to Torstar in 2017
Strathmore Standard (tabloid), closing 2018

Magazines
Financial Post Business
Living Windsor
Muskoka Magazine
Kingston Life Magazine
Interiors Magazine
Backpack Magazine
Cannabis Post
Muskoka Visitor Guide
Ontario Farmer Magazines (Hog, Beef, Dairy)
Swerve
TVtimes

Online
 Canada.com
 Infomart.com
 celebrating.com
 connecting.com
 driving.ca
 househunting.ca
 remembering.ca
 shoplocal.ca
 SwarmJam.com

In addition, Postmedia Network owns all websites associated with all properties listed on this page either wholly or in partnership.

Software
 QuickTrac
 QuickWire

See also
Other media groups in Canada include:
 Torstar
 Metroland Media Group
 Star Media Group
 Quebecor Media
 SaltWire Network
 The Woodbridge Company
 TC Transcontinental

Related articles
History of Canadian newspapers
Media of Canada

References

External links

Canada.com web portal

Companies listed on the Toronto Stock Exchange
Mass media companies established in 2010